Torryburn railway station served the village of Torryburn, Fife, Scotland from 1906 to 1930 on the Kincardine Line.

History 
The station was opened on 2 July 1906 by The Kincardine and Dunfermline Railway which had been incorporated by the North British Railway.

The goods yard was to the south of the line.

The station closed on 7 July 1930. Despite being closed the station was host to a LNER camping coach from 1937 to 1938 and campers were advised to take a bus to the coach from one of the Dunfermline stations.

References 

Disused railway stations in Fife
Railway stations in Great Britain opened in 1906
Railway stations in Great Britain closed in 1930
Former North British Railway stations
1906 establishments in Scotland
1930 disestablishments in Scotland